The Filchner Mountains are a group of mountains  southwest of the Drygalski Mountains, at the western end of the Orvin Mountains of Queen Maud Land, Antarctica. They were discovered by the Third German Antarctic Expedition (1938–1939), led by Capt. Alfred Ritscher, and named for Wilhelm Filchner, leader of the German expedition to the Weddell Sea area in 1911–12. They were remapped from air photos taken by the Sixth Norwegian Antarctic Expedition, 1958–59.

See also
 Djupedalsleitet Saddle
 List of mountains of Queen Maud Land
 Kubusdaelda
 Kubusdalen

References 

Mountain ranges of Queen Maud Land
Orvin Mountains